Tom Soetaers (born 21 July 1980) is a Belgian former footballer who played as a midfielder and current football coach, mostly being deployed as a left-winger. He is currently in charge of SC Hoegaarden-Outgaarden.

Club career
Soetaers began his career at Belgian side Anderlecht where he made just seven appearances for the first team before moving to the Netherlands to play for Roda JC. He spent three years at Roda becoming a big part of their team and was signed by league rivals AFC Ajax. However Soetaers failed to ever really establish himself at the club and after just over a year he returned to his home country with K.R.C. Genk.

On his return to Belgium Soetaers managed to rediscover the form he showed at Roda JC and helped the side to qualify for the UEFA Champions League for two seasons. He also won the Belgian Cup in 2008–09 with K.R.C. Genk, beating K.V. Mechelen in the final. On 21 June 2009, Soetaers signed a two-year contract with K.V. Kortrijk, but after only 6 months he went to KV Mechelen, in a transfer deal that included Giuseppe Rossini who went the other way.

Soetaers currently has eight caps for Belgium winning his first in 2003 in a match against Poland.

Currently Soetaers is working for the TV channel 2Be.

Honours
Roda JC
KNVB Cup: 1999–2000

Genk
Belgian Cup: 2008–09

References

External links
 
 
 Tom Soetaers at Footballdatabase

1980 births
Living people
Belgian footballers
Belgium youth international footballers
Belgium under-21 international footballers
Belgium international footballers
R.S.C. Anderlecht players
Roda JC Kerkrade players
AFC Ajax players
K.R.C. Genk players
K.V. Kortrijk players
K.V. Mechelen players
Belgian Pro League players
Eredivisie players
Belgian expatriate footballers
Expatriate footballers in the Netherlands
Belgian expatriate sportspeople in the Netherlands
People from Tienen
Association football midfielders
Footballers from Flemish Brabant